= Xenophonus =

Former species of beetle

Xenophonus hirtus was formerly the name of a species of beetles in the family Carabidae, the only species of the genus Xenophonus. The species name is currently invalid, and the genus name is invalid or doubtful.
